The violet vinegar crab (Episesarma versicolor) is a swimming crab species in the genus Episesarma. Distributed all over marine and brackish waters of Indo-West Pacific regions. It is harvested by many local fishermen for rich proteinaceous food.

Distribution
A mangrove inhabitant, it is found all over Southeast Asian countries such as Southern China, Hong Kong, Indonesia, Malaysia, Philippines, Singapore, Thailand, northern Australia and South Asian countries like Bangladesh, India and Sri Lanka. They also seem to possess an estimate of around 40 bony spine-like structures called tubercles. These are more pronounced in males and these tubercles like in other crab species that have them seemingly represent stridulatory organs used to create sound.

Description
Male grows up to maximum length of 5 cm. Carapace square-shaped and relatively flat. Body color brown to brownish grey in carapace with violet colored outer surface of palm with proximal parts. Fingers are whitish.

Reproduction 
Like most crabs they possess both male and female sexes. A ritual is generally performed utilizing both olfactory and tactile cues followed by an indirect sperm transfer.

Ecology
The species is well distributed in mangrove regions, inhabits burrows at tree bases or sometimes within mounds created by Thalassina lobsters. They are omnivorous, but feed primarily on calyx and leaves of water plants, mangroves and mangrove associates, usually at night. During high tides, they usually climb trees, as high as 6m up.

Feeding 
Episesarma versicolor are omnivorous but primarily prefer eating leaves and calyx off of mangrove trees. They dig their burrows around the roots of mangrove trees and can utilize their arboreal abilities to climb on these roots when disturbed. They have been observed cutting leaf litters and bringing some fragments back to their burrows.To remove leaves from trees they tear off a section of the leaf with their claws and feed on those small sections they tear off. It is observed that leaves with previous damage from other herbivorous organisms are targeted by the crabs for feeding utilizing previous holes to tear off sections easier.

Behavior 
Episesarma versicolor utilize three different sounds when communicating and competing with each other in the form of rapping, vibrating and leg stamping. Each form communicates a different message. Rapping is the action of repeatedly hitting their claws against the substrate. It is generally observed in displays of territory defense against other individuals. Leg stamping is when the leg repeatedly strikes against the substrate. Leg stamping has been observed when used to show dominance for mates or territory, even when the Episesarma versicolor are fighting it is observed that they will still utilize leg stamping in their fights. Vibrating is the action of Episesarma versicolor raising one of their legs and vibrating it in the air rapidly. This behavior is utilized by Episesarma versicolor after competition between species resembling a victory dance against competition.

References

Portunoidea
Crustaceans described in 1940